Avid Technology is an American technology and multimedia company based in Burlington, Massachusetts, and founded in August 1987 by Bill Warner. It specialises in audio and video; specifically, digital non-linear editing (NLE) systems, video editing software, audio editing software, music notation software, management and distribution services.

Avid products are now used in the television and video industry to create television shows, feature films, and commercials. Media Composer, a professional non-linear editing system, is Avid's flagship product.

History
Avid was founded by Bill Warner, a former marketing manager from Apollo Computer. A prototype of their first non-linear editing system, the Avid/1 Media Composer, was shown at the National Association of Broadcasters (NAB) convention in April 1988. The Avid/1 was based on an Apple Macintosh II computer, with special hardware and software of Avid's own design installed.
The Avid/1 was "the biggest shake-up in editing since Melies played with time and sequences in the early 1900s". By the early 1990s, Avid products began to replace such tools as the Moviola, Steenbeck, and KEM flatbed editors, allowing editors to handle their film creations with greater ease. The first feature film edited using the Avid was Let's Kill All the Lawyers in 1992, directed by Ron Senkowski. The film was edited at 30fps NTSC rate, then used Avid MediaMatch to generate a negative cutlist from the EDL. The first feature film edited natively at 24fps with what was to become the Avid Film Composer was Emerson Park. The first studio film to be edited at 24fps was Lost in Yonkers, directed by Martha Coolidge. By 1994 only three feature films used the new digital editing system.  By 1995 dozens had switched to Avid, and it signaled the beginning of the end of cutting celluloid.  In 1996 Walter Murch accepted the Academy Award for editing The English Patient (which also won best picture), which he cut on the Avid. This was the first Editing Oscar awarded to a digitally edited film (although the final print was still created with traditional negative cutting).

In 1994 Avid introduced Open Media Framework (OMF) as an open standard file format for sharing media and related metadata.  In recent years the company has extended its business expertise through several acquisitions and internal investments towards the full palette of multimedia generation products including those to store and manage media files.  In 2006 Avid launched new products such as Avid Interplay and Unity Isis.  Avid used to be considered just a "video editing" company, but now has consolidated a well-rounded multimedia generation technology company.

In the past, Avid released Avid Free DV, a free edition of Media Composer with limited functionality; Xpress DV, a consumer edition of Media Composer; and Xpress Pro, a prosumer edition of Media Composer. These editions were discontinued in 2008 as the flagship Media Composer has been lowered in price.

On March 29, 1999, Avid Technology, Inc. adjusted the amount originally allocated to IPR&D and restated its third quarter 1998 consolidated financial statements accordingly, considering the SEC's views.

In February 2018, Avid appointed Jeff Rosica as CEO, after terminating Louis Hernandez Jr.,who was accused of workplace misconduct.

Awards

In 1993, the National Academy of Television Arts & Sciences awarded Avid Technology and all of the company's initial employees with a technical Emmy award for Outstanding Engineering Development for the Avid Media Composer video editing system.

On March 21, 1999, at the 71st Academy Awards, Avid Technology Inc. was awarded an Oscar for the concept, system design and engineering of the Avid Film Composer for motion picture editing which was accepted by founder Bill Warner.

Acquisitions

See also
List of music software
List of video editing software
List of scorewriters

References

External links

1987 establishments in Massachusetts
Companies based in Burlington, Massachusetts
Companies listed on the Nasdaq
Electronics companies established in 1987
American companies established in 1987
Audio equipment manufacturers of the United States
Manufacturing companies based in Massachusetts
Software companies based in Massachusetts
Software companies established in 1987
Manufacturers of professional audio equipment
Recipients of the Scientific and Technical Academy Award of Merit
1993 initial public offerings
Software companies of the United States